"" ("Above Tatras it is lightening") is the national anthem of Slovakia. The origins of it are in the Central European activism of the 19th century. Its main themes are a storm over the Tatra mountains that symbolized danger to the Slovaks, and a desire for a resolution of the threat. It used to be particularly popular during the 1848–1849 insurgencies.

It was one of Czechoslovakia's dual national anthems and was played in many Slovak towns at noon; this tradition ceased to exist after Czechoslovakia split into two different states in the early 1990s with the dissolution of Czechoslovakia.

Origin

Background

23-year-old Janko Matúška wrote the lyrics of "Nad Tatrou sa blýska" in January and February 1844. The tune came from the folk song "Kopala studienku" suggested to him by his fellow student Jozef Podhradský, a future religious and Pan-Slavic activist and gymnasial teacher and a similar Hungarian folk song, "Azt mondják, nem adnak engem galambomnak" (English: "They say, they won't let me marry my love"). Shortly afterwards, Matúška and about two dozen other students left their prestigious Lutheran lyceum of Pressburg (preparatory high school and college) in protest over the removal of Ľudovít Štúr from his teaching position by the Lutheran Church under pressure from the authorities. The territory of present-day Slovakia was part of the Kingdom of Hungary within the Austrian Empire then, and the officials objected to his Slovak nationalism.

"Lightning over the Tatras" was written during the weeks when the students were agitated about the repeated denials of their and others' appeals to the school board to reverse Štúr's dismissal. About a dozen of the defecting students transferred to the Lutheran gymnasium of Levoča. When one of the students, the 18-year-old budding journalist and writer Viliam Pauliny-Tóth, wrote down the oldest known record of the poem in his school notebook in 1844, he gave it the title of Prešporskí Slováci, budúci Levočania (Pressburg Slovaks, Future Levočians), which reflected the motivation of its origin.

The journey from Pressburg (present-day Bratislava) to Levoča took the students past the High Tatras, Slovakia's and the then Kingdom of Hungary's highest, imposing, and symbolic mountain range. A storm above the mountains is a key theme in the poem.

Versions
No authorized version of Matúška's lyrics has been preserved and its early records remained without attribution. He stopped publishing after 1849 and later became clerk of the district court. The song became popular during the Slovak Volunteer campaigns of 1848 and 1849. Its text was copied and recopied in hand before it appeared in print in 1851 (unattributed, as Dobrovoľnícka – Volunteer Song), which gave rise to some variation, namely concerning the phrase zastavme ich ("let's stop them") or zastavme sa ("let's stop"). A review of the extant copies and related literature inferred that Matúška's original was most likely to have contained "let's stop them." Among other documents, it occurred both in its oldest preserved handwritten record from 1844 and in its first printed version from 1851. The legislated Slovak national anthem uses this version, the other phrase was used before 1993.

National anthem
On 13 December 1918, only the first stanza of Janko Matúška's lyrics became half of the two-part bilingual Czechoslovak anthem, composed of the first stanza from a Czech operetta tune, Kde domov můj (Where Is My Home?), and the first stanza of Matúška's song, each sung in its respective language and both played in that sequence with their respective tunes. The songs reflected the two nations' concerns in the 19th century when they were confronted with the already fervent national-ethnic activism of the Hungarians and the Germans, their fellow ethnic groups in the Habsburg monarchy.

During the Second World War, "Hej, Slováci" was adopted as the unofficial state anthem of the puppet regime Slovak Republic.

When Czechoslovakia split into the Czech Republic and the Slovak Republic in 1993, the second stanza was added to the first and the result legislated as Slovakia's national anthem.

Lyrics

Only the first two stanzas have been legislated as the national anthem.

Poetics
One of the trends shared by many Slovak Romantic poets was frequent versification that imitated the patterns of the local folk songs. The additional impetus for Janko Matúška to embrace the trend in Lightning over the Tatras was that he actually designed it to replace the lyrics of an existing folk song. Among the Romantic-folkloric features in the structure of Lightning over the Tatras are the equal number of syllables per verse, and the consistent a−b−b−a disyllabic rhyming of verses 2-5 in each stanza. Leaving the first verses unrhymed was Matúška's license (a single matching sound, blýska—bratia, did not qualify as a rhyme):

— Nad Tatrou sa blýska
a - Hromy divo bijú
b - Zastavme ich bratia
b - Veď sa ony stratia
a - Slováci ožijú

Another traditional arrangement of Matúška's lines gives 4-verse stanzas rhymed a−b−b−a with the first verse made up of 12 syllables split by a mid-pause, and each of the remaining 3 verses made up of 6 syllables:
a - Nad Tatrou sa blýska, hromy divo bijú
b - Zastavme ich bratia
b - Veď sa ony stratia
a - Slováci ožijú

See also
Slovak nationalism

References

External links
 Anthem of the Slovak Republic – A page at the official website of the President of Slovakia featuring various audio files of the state anthem
 Slovak National Anthem, sheet music, lyrics
 Slovakia: Nad Tatrou sa blýska - Audio of the national anthem of Slovakia, with information and lyrics (archive link)

European anthems
National symbols of Slovakia
Slovak songs
National anthems
Slovak Uprising of 1848–49
National anthem compositions in G minor